John Alan Campbell (13 April 1899 – 20 February 1939) was a British rower who competed in the 1920 Summer Olympics.
 
Campbell was educated at Melbourne Grammar School and Jesus College, Cambridge. He rowed for Cambridge in the Boat Race in 1920. In 1920 he was a crew member of the British boat, which won the silver medal in the eights at the Summer Olympics. In 1921 he rowed in the Boat Race again and won Silver Goblets at Henley Royal Regatta partnering Humphrey Playford.

See also
List of Cambridge University Boat Race crews

References

External links
National Portrait Gallery

1899 births
1939 deaths
Alumni of Jesus College, Cambridge
British male rowers
Olympic rowers of Great Britain
Rowers at the 1920 Summer Olympics
Olympic silver medallists for Great Britain
Olympic medalists in rowing
Cambridge University Boat Club rowers
Medalists at the 1920 Summer Olympics